Catherine Ferry may refer to:

Catherine Ferry (singer), French singer
Catherine Ferry (East River), a former ferry in New York City